Asarcık is a district of Samsun Province of Turkey.

References

Populated places in Samsun Province
Districts of Samsun Province